Mariusz Idzik (born 1 April 1997) is a Polish professional footballer who plays as a forward for Górnik Polkowice.

References

External links
 
 

1997 births
Living people
Sportspeople from Wrocław
Association football forwards
Polish footballers
Ekstraklasa players
I liga players
II liga players
III liga players
Śląsk Wrocław players
Wisła Puławy players
Miedź Legnica players
Ruch Chorzów players
Górnik Polkowice players